Maumoon Abdul Gayoom (born 29 December 1937) is a Maldivian politician and an Islamic scholar who served as the President of Maldives from 1978 to 2008. After serving as Minister of Transport, he was nominated as President by the Majlis (Parliament) of the Maldives and succeeded Ibrahim Nasir in 1978. He was defeated in the October 2008 presidential election. In opposition, he continued to serve as leader of the Dhivehi Rayyithunge Party until January 2010, when he retired from active politics.

However, in September 2011, he returned to Maldivian politics as the leader of the newly formed Progressive Party of Maldives (PPM), whose candidate Abdulla Yameen Abdul Gayoom, Maumoon's half-brother, was victorious in the 2013 presidential elections. In July 2016, due to disagreements between president Yameen and Maumoon, the party split into two factions. Later in October 27, Maumoon withdrew his support for president Yameen and joined the Maldives United Opposition.

Maumoon was arrested on 5 February 2018, for allegedly conspiring to overthrow the government along his son-in-law Mohamed Nadheem. Maumoon's son, Faris Maumoon, was  arrested and released, then arrested again a day after his release. The Maldivian Democracy Network reported Maumoon and Faris were being tortured by not being allowed medical treatment.

Maumoon was freed on bail on 30 September 2018.

Career and politics

Education and family life
Maumoon Abdul Gayoom is the son of Abdul Gayyoom Ibrahim (Maafaiygey Dhon Seedhi) and Khadheeja Moosa. His father had 25 children from 8 wives. He is the 11th child of his family.

He spent most of his youth in Egypt. He was part of a group of 15 students chosen at the initiative of Mohamed Amin Didi to get an education abroad. At the age of 10, in 1947, he embarked for Egypt. However, because of the troubles which led to the Arab-Israeli war of 1948–1949, his layover in Ceylon, scheduled to last several days, lasted for two and a half years during which he studied at the  Buona Vista College, Galle, and Royal College, Colombo. He eventually reached Egypt in March 1950, after the end of the conflict.

He attended Al-Azhar University. He spent six months learning Arabic. He joined the Faculty and graduated in 1966. He also obtained a secondary level certificate in the English Language at the American University in Cairo.

In 1965, he met Nasreena Ibrahim, a student who had just arrived in Cairo from the Maldives for her studies. She was then 15 and he was 27. Four years later, they married in Cairo, on 14 July 1969. A few weeks after his marriage, he joined Ahmadu Bello University in Zaria, Nigeria as a lecturer in Islamic Studies and moved there with Nasreena.

Early career in the Maldives
When his two-year contract with Ahmadu Bello University ended, he returned to the Maldives in 1971. Three weeks later, he joined the Aminiyya School as a teacher of English, arithmetic and Islam. In 1972, he was appointed as the manager of the government shipping department.

On 12 March 1973, he was placed under house-arrest for criticizing President Ibrahim Nasir's policies for having no human rights. He was tried in court and sentenced to banishment for four years on 14 May 1973. On 21 May, he was taken to Makunudhoo Island of Haa Dhaalu Atoll.  he was released on 13 October 1973, after serving only five months, as a result of an amnesty following Nasir's re-election for a second five-year term.

In 1974, he was appointed under-secretary in the Telecommunications Department. He was thereafter promoted to director of the department. During this period, he worked as a part-time teacher in some private schools, teaching Islam, Arabic and English.

On 28 July 1974, he was again arrested for criticizing Nasir's policies. This time he was kept in solitary confinement in a prison in Malé nicknamed the 'China Garden', as Chinese fishermen were once detained there. This prison was later demolished during Maumoon's presidency and the Islamic Centre was erected on the site. After 50 days in jail, he was set free, in September 1974.

Six weeks later, he was appointed special undersecretary in the office of Prime Minister Ahmed Zaki. The post of Prime Minister was abolished with the removal and banishment of Ahmed Zaki from office, on 6 March 1975. With this decision, his position vanished as well. However, when he returned from Colombo, he was made the Deputy Ambassador of the Maldives to Sri Lanka. In 1975, he was sent to the United Nations for two months as a member of the Maldives delegation, part of the department of External Affairs (as the Foreign Ministry was then called). After nine weeks, he was appointed the Deputy Minister of Transport. One year later, he was tenured at the United Nations from September 1976 to January 1977. On 29 March 1977, Maumoon was appointed Minister of Transport, making him a member of Nasir's cabinet. He held the post until 10 November 1978.

Presidency

As Ibrahim Nasir's second term was coming to an end, he decided not to seek re-election and, in June 1978, the Citizen's Majlis was called upon to nominate a presidential candidate as required under the then-existing constitution. There were 45 votes for Nasir (despite his stated intention not to seek re-election), with the remaining 3 votes for Maumoon. Another ballot was called on 16 June. He received 27 votes, allowing his name to be put forward as the sole candidate.

Five months later, he was elected the new President of the Maldives, with 92.96% of the votes. In a 1983 referendum, he was re-elected on 30 September for a second term, polling  95.6%. On 23 September 1988, he was re-elected for a third term with 96.4% of the popular vote. On 1 October 1993, he was elected for a fourth term with 92.76% of the popular vote. On 16 October 1998, he was elected for a fifth term of office, this time with 90.9% of the popular vote. He was last re-elected to a sixth five-year term in October 2003 with 90.28% of the vote. In all cases, he was the sole candidate, having been nominated by the Majlis.

The President of the Maldives is both the Head of Government and Head of State, with very little distinction between the two roles. Therefore, Maumoon was also the Commander-in-Chief of the Maldivian armed forces, the Maldives National Defence Force. Additionally he held the portfolio of Minister of Finance, and the position of the governor of Maldives Monetary Authority.

In a 2007 referendum, voters approved a presidential system with direct election of the president rather than a parliamentary system.

Coups d'état

There were three attempts to overthrow Maumoon's government during the 1980s. The first one was in 1980 and second attempt was in 1983. The third attempt, which was in 1988, succeeded in controlling the capital city and many government offices. This coup d'état in Maldives against Maumoon's rule was foiled by the Indian Armed Forces, who intervened at his request.

Assassination attempt
On 8 January 2008, Maumoon escaped unharmed from an assassination attempt at Hoarafushi. Mohamed Murshid, a twenty-year-old man from the island, attempted to stab him with a knife concealed in a Maldives flag. The attempt was foiled when Mohamed Jaisham Ibrahim, a sixteen-year-old Boy Scout from the island, blocked the attack with his bare hands. Jaisham sustained injuries during the intervention and was subsequently treated.

2008 elections

The October 2008 Maldivian presidential election was the first presidential election Maumoon Abdul Gayoom allowed to be contested.  Standing as the DRP candidate, he lost in the election's second round, in which he received 45.75% of the vote against 54.25% for his opponents.  MDP's Presidential Candidate Mohamed Nasheed accordingly succeeded Maumoon as President on November 11, 2008, with Gaumee Itthihaad's  candidate Dr. Mohammed Waheed Hassan taking the new post of Vice President.

Maumoon's opponents and international human rights groups had accused him of employing terror tactics against dissidents, such as arbitrary arrests, detention without trial, employing torture, forced confessions, and politically motivated killings.
Maumoon's tenure was marked by corruption as well as autocratic rule, and, for a country so small, appalling human rights abuses and instances of torture. Even after he left office, he had a strong influence in parliament. Maumoon was declared the "Zaeem", or Honorary Leader, of his party in 2010.

Life after presidency 

On 26 March 2017 he joined the opposition to his half-brother Abdulla Yameen, who became president in 2013, and forged an alliance with his former rival Mohamed Nasheed in view of the 2018 presidential election. The party splitted into two factions, one supporting Yameen and the other supporting Maumoon. The pro-Maumoon faction was later formed a political party named as Maldives Reform Movement.

On 29 June 2018 Nasheed renounced to run in the Maldivian presidential election of 2018 after the refusal of the electoral commission to validate his candidacy. Ibrahim Mohamed Solih was chosen in his place. On election night the estimates of the results showed Solih as the clear winner. The electoral commission then confirmed these results during the night of 23 to 24 September. Abdulla Yameen publicly acknowledged defeat.

Arrest, conviction and release 

On 5 February 2018, Abdulla Yameen refused to implement a judgment of the Supreme Court relating to the release of political prisoners, including Faris, the son of Maumoon, despite the request of the UN and remarks that according to him, the Supreme Court ''is not above the law'', then besieged the offices of the Supreme Court, suspended the parliament, in which he had lost the majority after another decision by the Supreme Court ordering the reinstatement of deputies who had recently passed opposition, dismissed police chief, arrested Maumoon Abdul Gayoom and declared state of emergency. In the evening, he also arrested two judges of the Supreme Court, including it's president Abdulla Saeed, and Ali Hameed. He justified this by a ''conspiracy'' and a ''coup''. Nasheed then called on India and the United States to intervene. Finally, the three judges of the Supreme Court who remained free decided to annul the decision. The UN then denounced an ''attack on democracy''.

He was sentenced to 19 months in prison on 13 June 2018 for ''obstructing justice'', for having refused to speak to the judges and to cooperate with the police after his arrest. On September 2018, he was placed under house arrest for health reasons. A day after, he was released on bail and acquitted on 18 October.

References

Further reading
A Man for All Islands by Royston Ellis –

External links

Official site of the Presidency of the Maldives

|-

|-

1937 births
Al-Azhar University alumni
The American University in Cairo alumni
Living people
Alumni of Royal College, Colombo
Presidents of the Maldives
Finance ministers of the Maldives
Transport ministers of the Maldives
Governors of Maldives Monetary Authority
Permanent Representatives of the Maldives to the United Nations
Dhivehi Rayyithunge Party politicians
People from Malé
Maldivian Muslims
Dhaka College alumni
Stabbing survivors
Progressive Party of Maldives politicians
Maldivian expatriates in Nigeria
Academic staff of Ahmadu Bello University
Sri Lanka Mitra Vibhushana
Heads of government who were later imprisoned